Dr Dharmica Mistry is an Australian scientist and entrepreneur. Mistry is Director Diagnostics Industry Engagement at MTPConnect and co-founder and ex-Chief Scientist of BCAL Diagnostics, a biotechnology company developing a revolutionary blood test for early detection of breast cancer.

Early life and education 
Mistry was born in England to Indian parents. She moved to Australia when she was six years old and lived with her family in Sutherland Shire, Sydney. Mistry attended Oyster Bay Primary School, followed by Gymea Technology High School.

Mistry initially felt she would pursue a career in dietetics, but later discovered an interest in microbiology. She graduated with a Bachelor of Science with Honours in Microbiology in 2007 at the University of Sydney. She then went on to complete a PhD in Medicine at Macquarie University, focusing her research on novel biomarkers in blood and hair that can be used as the basis for blood tests for breast cancer.

Career and research 
From 2008, Mistry worked as a lab technician for a small Australian start-up company investigating the association between hair and breast cancer, using her own hair as a negative control. After graduating from the University of Sydney, Mistry and Peter French, a cell and molecular biologist, co-founded Breast Cancer-Associated Lipid (BCAL) Diagnostics. The company aims to commercialise their groundbreaking breast cancer screening test, which has proven 90 percent accurate in detecting the presence of the most common form of invasive cancer.

Awards 

 Peoples Choice Award, Australian Technologies Competition, 2017
 InStyle Women Of Style, Science category, 2017
 Harvey Norman NSW Young Women of the Year, 2016
 Australian Financial Review BOSS Young Executive of the Year, 2016
 Young Sutherland Shire Scientist, 2016

References 

Living people
University of Sydney alumni
Macquarie University alumni
Cancer researchers
Year of birth missing (living people)